Gomang Co (Also spelled as Guomang Cuo and Guomangcuo) is a mountain graben basin lake on the Tibetan Plateau in Xainza County within Nagqu in the Tibet Autonomous Region of China. Gomang Co has a  Köppen climate classification of existing in a tundra climate. The lake's water level is controlled by its outlet toward Siling Lake, which is north of Gomang Co.

See also

 Bangecuo
 Dazecuo
 Lake Urru
 Namtso

References

Further reading

External links
 

Lakes of Tibet
Xainza County